Frémicourt is a commune in the Pas-de-Calais department in the Hauts-de-France region of France.

Geography

Population

Places of interest
 The church of St. Armand, rebuilt as was the rest of the village, after World War I.

See also
Communes of the Pas-de-Calais department
Cecil Sewell Victoria Cross recipient after WW1 action near Frémicourt

References

Communes of Pas-de-Calais